Lockdown Island is the first Mauritian TV reality show. Around 17 participants, which en globes influencers, sportsmen, singers among other popular personalities are locked up, showing the lifestyle of the housemates during their stay in a villa for around twenty days. Its trailer first premiered online on 7 June 2020.

Lockdown Island Contestants 2020

References

External links 
 
 

Mauritian reality television series